KK Radnički may refer to:
 Basketball clubs in Serbia
 BKK Radnički, based in Belgrade (1945–present)
 KK Radnički Basket/Radnički FMP, based in Belgrade (2009–2013); later renamed to FMP
 KK Radnički Kovin, based in Kovin (1967–present)
 KK Radnički Obrenovac, based in Obrenovac
 KK Radnički Novi Sad, based in Novi Sad (1970–2009); relocated to Belgrade in 2009 and renamed to Radnički Basket
 KK Radnički Valjevo, based in Valjevo (2013–present)
 Basketball clubs in Kragujevac
 KKK Radnički or SPD Radnički, (2015–present), currently competing in the 2nd-tier league
 KK Radnički 1950, (2014–present), currently competing in the 2nd-tier league
 KK Radnički Kragujevac (1950–2004), defunct team, merged into Radnički Zastava
 KK Radnički Kragujevac (2009–2014), defunct team, formerly known as KK Lions Vršac
 KK Radnički Zastava/Radnički KG 06, (2004–2011), defunct team
 KK Radnički Student, (2008–2018), defunct team
 Basketball clubs in Bosnia and Herzegovina
 KK Radnički Goražde, based in Goražde

See also 
 FK Radnički (disambiguation)